Allgood, formerly known as Chepultepec, is a town in Blount County, Alabama, United States. At the 2020 census, the population was 548.

History
One source said the town's name comes from a family of homesteaders from South Carolina who settled in the area in the early 19th century. However, another states that the original name of the village, Chepultepec, probably named for the Battle of Chapultepec in the Mexican–American War, was changed to "Allgood" in December 1915. A local lime manufacturer believed he was not getting repeat business because of the difficulty in spelling the name of the village and persuaded the local postmaster to change the name, with the postmaster giving the village his own name of Allgood. The town was formally incorporated in 1959. In 2010, it became the first locality in Alabama to achieve a Hispanic plurality.

Geography
Allgood is located in south-central Blount County at  (33.904216, −86.516428). It is in the Murphree Valley, with Straight Mountain to the southeast and Red Mountain and Sand Mountain to the northwest. Alabama State Route 75 passes through the town, leading northeast  to Oneonta, the county seat, and southwest  to Birmingham.

Demographics

Allgood

Allgood first appeared on the 1960 U.S. Census as an incorporated town.

2020 Census data

As of the 2020 United States census, there were 548 people, 208 households, and 152 families residing in the town.

2000 Census data
As of the census of 2000, there were 629 people, 189 households, and 140 families residing in the town. The racial makeup of the town was 83.94% White, 0.32% Black or African American, 0.48% Native American, 12.08% from other races, and 3.18% from two or more races. 43.40% of the population were Hispanic or Latino of any race.

There were 189 households, out of which 40.7% had children under the age of 18 living with them, 62.4% were married couples living together, 8.5% had a female householder with no husband present, and 25.9% were non-families. 18.5% of all households were made up of individuals, and 7.4% had someone living alone who was 65 years of age or older. The average household size was 3.33 and the average family size was 3.80.

In the town, the population dispersal was 30.7% under the age of 18, 14.8% from 18 to 24, 34.3% from 25 to 44, 15.4% from 45 to 64, and 4.8% who were 65 years of age or older. The median age was 28 years. For every 100 females, there were 109.0 males. For every 100 females age 18 and over, there were 116.9 males. The median income for a household in the town was $29,583, and the median income for a family was $30,750. Males had a median income of $31,058 versus $25,486 for females. The per capita income for the town was $11,729. About 23.4% of families and 27.3% of the population were below the poverty line, including 33.9% of those under age 18 and 8.7% of those age 65 or over.

Chepultepec/Allgood Precinct (1890–1950)

The precinct containing Allgood first appeared on the 1890 U.S. Census under its earlier name of Chepultepec, as the 11th precinct of Blount County. In 1950, the precinct was renamed Allgood. In 1960, the precinct was merged as part of a larger reorganization of counties into the census division of Oneonta.

Water system controversy 
The town received international press coverage when it posted a notice that residents who failed to "HAVE AN ALABAMA DRIVER'S LICENSE OR ALABAMA PICTURE ID CARD ON FILE AT THIS OFFICE" may lose water service. The notice is reported to be a reaction to an anti-illegal immigration bill, Alabama HB 56.

Notable people
 Miles C. Allgood, U.S. Representative from Alabama's 5th congressional district from 1923 to 1935
 Albert A. Murphree, president of Florida State University from 1897 to 1909 and president of the University of Florida from 1909 to 1927

References 

Towns in Blount County, Alabama
Towns in Alabama
Birmingham metropolitan area, Alabama